Daniel Sánchez Gálvez (born 3 March 1974 in Santa Coloma de Gramenet, and best known as Dani Sánchez) is a Spanish professional carom billiards player who plays for FC Porto a club he has represented for the last 21 years.

Career
He first reached the finals of the UMB World Three-cushion Championship in 1996, but finished 2nd to Christian Rudolph. He successfully took the title in 1998, defeating 17-time World Champion Torbjörn Blomdahl. He won it again in 2005 against Jean Paul de Bruijn, in 2010 against Eddy Leppens and in 2016 against Kim Haeng-jik.

Sánchez is a winner of the CEB European Three-cushion Championship twice (1997 and 2000) and is a 31-time Spanish national Champion. He is 15-time Three-cushion Billiard champion of Spain.

He also won three gold medals at The World Games in three-cushion in 2001, 2005 and 2017, defeating Dick Jaspers on the first two occasions and Marco Zanetti at the latest edition. By 2015 he won his fifth Overall-World Cup title.

Records 
His highest  (HR) in competition is 23 (2016 Spanish Championship) which is also the new Spanish record, and his best game average is 5 (50  in 10 ).

References

External links

 Sánchez's official homepage
 Track record: breakdown (in Spanish)
 Dani Sanchez runs 23 YouTube-Video
 Tournament photos
 

Spanish carom billiards players
World champions in three-cushion billiards
World Cup champions in three-cushion billiards
1974 births
Living people
Sportspeople from Santa Coloma de Gramenet
World Games gold medalists
Competitors at the 2001 World Games
Competitors at the 2017 World Games
Competitors at the 2005 World Games
Competitors at the 2009 World Games